is an Israeli UCI Continental team founded in 2020 that acts as a development team for UCI ProTeam .

Team roster

Major results
2020
  National Under-23 Road Race Championships, Omer Lahav
 Stage 1 Course de Solidarność et des Champions Olympiques, Itamar Einhorn
2021
  National Under-23 Time Trial Championships, Oded Kogut
 Stage 2 Troféu Joaquim Agostinho, Alastair Mackellar
 Stage 5 Volta a Portugal, Mason Hollyman
2022
Stage 4 Circuit des Ardennes, Marco Frigo
2023
  National Under-23 Road Race Championships, Alastair Mackellar

National champions
2020
  Israel U23 Road Race, Omer Lahav
2021
  Israel U23 Time Trial, Oded Kogut
2022
  Canada Time Trial, Derek Gee
2023
  Australia U23 Road Race, Alastair Mackellar

References

External links 

UCI Continental Teams (Europe)
Cycling teams established in 2020
2020 establishments in Israel
Israel–Premier Tech